Melissa Ann Lawson (born April 10, 1976) is an American country music singer. On August 4, 2008, she was declared the winner of the television program Nashville Star, a country music singing competition which aired on NBC. Signed to Warner Bros. Records Nashville, she released her debut single "What If It All Goes Right" that year, and charted on Hot Country Songs with it. Although Lawson's label released her before she debuted her first album, she is currently performing and released 2 EPs in 2010.

Biography
Born in Dallas, Texas, Melissa grew up in Arlington, TX, where she continues to make her home. She Attended the Professional Youth Conservatory (Performing Arts High School) in Ft. Worth.  When the School closed suddenly her senior year, she ended up Graduating from Arlington High School with the Principal's award.  She attended Texas Wesleyan University on a drama, vocal and academic scholarship.  Lawson is a working mother and entrepreneur with 7 biological sons ages 4–19 and 2 bonus daughters Ages 18 & 17.  
She owns a Christmas lighting company, DFW Holiday Lights, which offers commercial and residential holiday decor and lighting. 
After years of performing locally, and regionally, In 2004, she tried out for the fourth season of American Idol, and made it to the final day of Hollywood week, eventually being cut in the top 75. After settling back into leading worship at her home church, In 2008, she tried to reach for the stars again, but this time, not only did she make it onto Nashville Star on NBC, but she won.  She has since traveled the world, singing at the Olympics in Beijing, China, on the Grand Ole Opry, and had the privilege of writing with top Nashville Writers.  
Lawson was also to appear with her family on an episode of the NBC 2010 summer series Breakthrough with Tony Robbins dealing with personal issues with her then husband of 20 years, Rick, in the wake of her fame. However the program was canceled from airing on television before Lawson's episode could air, and it instead premiered in mid-August 2010 for video-on-demand streaming via NBC.com for a limited one-month period and then ultimately on the Oprah Winfrey Network and on Australian television

Music career

2008-present: "What If It All Goes Right" and label release
Following her win on Nashville Star, Lawsons' debut single, "What If It All Goes Right", was released on August 5, 2008 to radio. It debuted and peaked at No. 49 on the U.S. Billboard Hot Country Songs chart as well as No. 79 on the Billboard Hot 100, due to legal music downloads. It was then re-released in November 2008, where it re-entered the country charts at No. 55, and eventually reached No. 43. It was the number one Country music download on iTunes and Top 10 for all genres within 24 hours of release.

Warner Brothers, as a major label, was experiencing challenges in the industry which led them to the decision to not promote new artists. Melissa Lawson was released by Warner. John Rich, her personal mentor on Nashville Star, successfully produced a number of tracks, which Melissa was able to secure the rights to the recordings, for future release.  In 2009 Melissa and her ex-husband Rick co-wrote "United We Stand" for their appearance on the "Breakthrough with Tony Robbins" show and were nominated for two Grammy awards.

Nashville Star
Melissa Lawson was the oldest contestant among the ten finalists. She has lost almost 100 pounds since first auditioning for the show.

She is the sixth "Nashville Star", following previous winners Buddy Jewell, Brad Cotter, Erika Jo, Chris Young and Angela Hacker. The sixth season marked the first time Nashville Star was featured on NBC, after five seasons on USA Network.

Songs performed on Nashville Star
"Something to Talk About" by Bonnie Raitt
"(You Make Me Feel Like) A Natural Woman" by Aretha Franklin (Bottom Two)
"True Colors" by Cyndi Lauper
"Landslide" by Fleetwood Mac (Highest Number of Votes)
"This One's for the Girls" by Martina McBride (Bottom Two)
"Danny's Song" by Loggins and Messina
"My Baby Loves Me" by Martina McBride
"Ready to Stand" by Melissa Lawson & Margi Howard
"Hit Me with Your Best Shot" by Pat Benatar
"Jesus, Take the Wheel" by Carrie Underwood
"Something More" by Sugarland
"My Wish" by Rascal Flatts
"What If It All Goes Right"

Discography

Extended plays

Singles

References

External links
Melissa Lawson's Official Web Site
Melissa Lawson's NBC/Nashville Star Bio

1976 births
American women country singers
American country singer-songwriters
American Idol participants
People from Arlington, Texas
Living people
Nashville Star contestants
Nashville Star winners
Warner Records artists
21st-century American women singers
21st-century American singers
Singer-songwriters from Texas